Sheila Tate is a former American White House official. She served as First Lady Nancy Reagan's press secretary from 1981 to 1985.

Works

References

External links

Living people
Reagan administration personnel
Year of birth missing (living people)